Kenneth Charlie Griffith Benjamin (born  8 April 1967) is a former cricketer from Antigua and Barbuda who played 26 Tests and 26 One Day Internationals for the West Indies.

A right arm fast bowler, Benjamin spent much of his international career bowling alongside Courtney Walsh and Curtly Ambrose. He made his Test debut in their side's first ever Test against South Africa, in 1991–92. He never really made a name for himself until a spell of 6–66 against England in 1993–94 which he followed up with seven wickets in his next Test, finishing the series with 22 wickets.

Benjamin was West Indies’ top bowler during the six-Test series in England in 1995. His 23 wickets at 22.00 saw him finish ahead of Ambrose, Walsh and Ian Bishop, while his 10-wicket haul in the fifth Test (5/107 & 5/69) at Trent Bridge bumped him to 10th in the ICC Rankings.

After a playing career that included spells in English and South African domestic cricket, Benjamin coached the United States cricket team. While playing for Netherfield cricket team(Kendal) in England's Northern Premier League system, Benjamin was also contracted to coach schoolchildren, one of whom, Will Greenwood, went on to play international rugby for England. Greenwood remembers Benjamin's unique approach to keeping his young pupils attentive:

"If you were foolish enough to horse about, he'd bowl at you, coming in off just one yard and fire down the fastest ball you ever faced. He would then walk down the wicket, and, in a lazy West Indian drawl, say, "Don't mess about in my net sessions"."

Michael Vaughan, in his autobiography, gives credit to a "scary" time spent facing Benjamin in the nets, as formative in his development in facing fast bowlers. Aged 14, Vaughan made the first team at Sheffield Collegiate, for whom Benjamin also played.

References

1967 births
Living people
Easterns cricketers
Gauteng cricketers
Leeward Islands cricketers
West Indies One Day International cricketers
West Indies Test cricketers
Antigua and Barbuda cricketers
Worcestershire cricketers
Commonwealth Games competitors for Antigua and Barbuda
Cricketers at the 1998 Commonwealth Games
Marylebone Cricket Club cricketers
People from St. John's, Antigua and Barbuda
Scarborough Festival President's XI cricketers